Orville Willis Singer (December 27, 1898 – June 29, 1985) was an American baseball second baseman in the Negro leagues.

He was born in Cambridge, Ohio and played most years for the Lincoln Giants club, then played the rest of his seasons for Cleveland, Ohio teams.

Singer died at the age of 86 in Dorset, Ohio.

References

External links
 and Seamheads

1898 births
1985 deaths
Baseball players from Ohio
Cleveland Browns (baseball) players
Cleveland Cubs players
Cleveland Tigers (baseball) players
Lincoln Giants players
People from Cambridge, Ohio
20th-century African-American sportspeople
Baseball infielders